Spring Village is a village in Saint Patrick Parish on the island of Saint Vincent in Saint Vincent and the Grenadines. It is located to the southeast of Westwood, just to the south of Rose Hall.

References

Scott, C. R. (ed.) (2005) Insight guide: Caribbean (5th edition). London: Apa Publications.

Populated places in Saint Vincent and the Grenadines